The Paper Aircraft Released Into Space (PARIS) project was a privately organised endeavour undertaken by various staff members of the British information technology web site The Register to design, build, test, and launch a lightweight aerospace vehicle, constructed mostly of paper and similar structural materials, into the mid-stratosphere and recover it intact.

Project
Staffers at The Register, inspired by the CU Spaceflight Nova 1 project, formally announced their intention to initiate a project of their own on 30 July 2009. The aircraft's name was selected by a poll of the readers of The Register. was subsequently named Vulture 1 (a reference to The Register own nickname "Vulture Central").

Lester Haines, special projects editor ("Iberian Bureau") at The Register, as part of his reporting on CU Spaceflight's Nova 1 mission in 2006, and at the behest of Nova team member Carl Morland, mused that "El Reg might like to contribute something" as a payload to a future high-altitude balloon project, and invited the online magazine's readership to make suggestions as to what kind of payload package should be designed and built. After languishing for a few years in limbo, the balloon payload project was resurrected in July, 2009 and called PARIS, as a backronym from Paper Aircraft Released Into Space after Paris Hilton, the payload type having been suggested by readers in 2006.

The paper plane was successfully launched on 28 October 2010.

Future

, The Register was working on PARIS' successor, named LOHAN (short for "Low Orbit Helium Assisted Navigator", a balloon-launched rocket-powered aircraft.

See also
Paper planes launched from space

References 

Paper vehicles
Paper planes